The Central Expressway (CTE) in Singapore is the major highway connecting the city centre of Singapore with the northern residential parts of the island, including Toa Payoh, Bishan and Ang Mo Kio and further onwards to the Seletar Expressway and the Tampines Expressway.

As of 29 December 2013, SLE and CTE are one of the two pairs of expressways in Singapore which are linked together, the other being the KPE and MCE.

Route description
Beginning at a junction with the Ayer Rajah Expressway (AYE) in Bukit Merah, the expressway runs northeast, passing through Outram and parallel to Chin Swee Road. The CTE then runs through two tunnels between Chin Swee Road and Bukit Timah Road, with an at-grade segment between Buyong Road and Cairnhill Circle, before continuing northeast, between Kallang and Novena. The expressway then turns north, intersecting the Pan Island Expressway (PIE) and passing through Toa Payoh, Bishan and Ang Mo Kio before terminating at an interchange with the Seletar Expressway (SLE) and Tampines Expressway (TPE),
and measures .

History

Construction
Work on the first phase of the CTE, between Ang Mo Kio Avenue 1 and Thomson Road, commenced in July 1981. This segment of expressway was opened to traffic in January 1987, while the  section between Ang Mo Kio Avenue 5 and Yio Chu Kang Road was constructed between August 1986 and
November 1988.

The contract for the second phase of the CTE was awarded in December 1987. Work on the second phase commenced in June 1987, and the tunnels were constructed using the cut-and-cover method. As the areas along the expressway's route were heavily built-up, precautions were taken to limit disruption to the public during construction, with the exclusive use of hydraulic piling machines and work near residential areas being paused at night. In addition, cofferdams were built in the Singapore River to facilitate construction of the expressway tunnels, and to prevent erosion, the river bed directly above the tunnels was covered with rocks. The segment of expressway between Outram Road and the Ayer Rajah Expressway opened in September 1988, but the construction of the tunnels was delayed, which the government attributed to a shortage of workers and "poor soil conditions near Cairnhill Circle". Construction on the CTE's second phase was completed in May 1991, and the opening of the two tunnels, which were named the Kampong Java and Chin Swee Tunnels, in September 1991 marked the completion of the expressway.

Impact and expansion
Traffic volumes along the CTE rose after the expressway was fully opened, and in May 1994, the section of expressway between Ang Mo Kio Avenue One and the PIE was expanded to eight lanes to ease traffic congestion. A traffic monitoring system, the Expressway Monitoring and Advisory System, was introduced on the expressway in March 1998.
By the late 1990s, the CTE faced traffic congestion issues, and while a road pricing scheme was introduced to rectify the issue, it was unable to eliminate it.

In 2008, a large-scale improvement of the CTE was initiated, and the first phase of the scheme, consisting of the expansion of the expressway between Ang Mo Kio Avenues One and Three, started in June 2008, and cost S$17 million. Subsequently, flyovers were constructed at the junction with the PIE to improve traffic flow, while other sections of the CTE, between Bukit Timah Road and Yio Chu Kang Road, were widened, and the improvement scheme was completed by December 2011.

Road interchanges
{| class="wikitable"
|-
! scope="col" | Exit
! scope="col" | Destinations
! scope="col" | Notes
|- 
| 
| Ayer Rajah Expressway (Jurong)
| 
|- style="background: #ffdddd"
|1
|TPE (PIE - Changi Airport / KPE)
| Northbound exit and southbound entrance only
|-style="background: #ffdddd"
| 1A
| Jalan Bukit Merah
| Northbound entrance and southbound exit only
|-
| 1B
| Chin Swee Road, Tiong Bahru Road, Outram Road
| 
|-
| 2
| Clemenceau Avenue, Merchant Road, Havelock Road
| 
|- style="background: #ffdddd"
| 4
| Orchard Road
| Northbound entrance and southbound exit only
|- style="background: #ffdddd"
| 5
| Cairnhill Circle
| Northbound entrance and southbound exit only
|- style="background: #ffdddd"
| 6
| Bukit Timah Road, Cavenagh Road
| Northbound entrance and southbound exit only
|-
| 7A
| Moulmein Road
| Signed as Exits 7D (Jalan Kebun Limau, Balestier Road) and 7C (Balestier Road, Moulmien Road) southbound
|- style="background: #ffdddd"
| 7B
| Jalan Bahagia
| Northbound exit only
|- style="background: #ffdddd"
| 8A
| Pan Island Expressway (PIE) (Tuas)
| Northbound entrance and southbound exit only
|-
| 8B
| PIE (Changi Airport), Upper Serangoon Road
| 
|-
| 10
| Braddell Road
| 
|-
| 11
| Ang Mo Kio Avenue 1
| 
|-
| 14
| Ang Mo Kio Avenue 3, Ang Mo Kio Avenue 5
| Signed as Exits 12A (Ang Mo Kio Avenue 3) and 12B (Ang Mo Kio Avenue 5) northbound
|-
| 15
| Yio Chu Kang Road
| 
|- style="background: #dff9f9"
| 16
| Seletar West Link (Yishun Avenue 1), Seletar Expressway (SLE)
| Northbound terminus; expressway continues as SLE

References

External links

 Traffic cameras monitoring the CTE
 Infopedia article on Central Expressway

Expressways in Singapore
Road tunnels in Singapore
Ang Mo Kio
Bishan, Singapore
Bukit Merah
Downtown Core (Singapore)
Kallang
Novena, Singapore
Sengkang
Serangoon
Toa Payoh
Tunnels completed in 1989
Transport in North-East Region, Singapore